Ping Shan Heritage Trail is a heritage trail located in the Ping Shan area of Yuen Long District, in Hong Kong. The trail was inaugurated on 12 December 1993 and was the first of its kind in Hong Kong. It passes through the villages of Hang Tau Tsuen, Hang Mei Tsuen and Sheung Cheung Wai and it includes several declared monuments and graded buildings.

The Ping Shan Tang Clan Gallery and Heritage Trail Visitors Centre was opened in 2007. It is housed in the Old Ping Shan Police Station.

Sights included in the trail
The trail includes the following 14 historic buildings:

1. Ping Shan Tang Clan Gallery
The Ping Shan Tang Clan Gallery cum Heritage Trail Visitors Centre was opened in 2007. It is housed in the Old Ping Shan Police Station.

2. Hung Shing Temple
This Hung Shing Temple was constructed by the Tang Clan residing in Ping Shan. It was probably built in 1767 during the Qianlong reign of the Qing dynasty. The existing structure was rebuilt in 1866, followed by a substantial renovation in 1963. It is a Grade II historic building.

3. Entrance Hall of Shut Hing Study Hall
 was built in 1874 by the Tang clan to commemorate the ancestor, Tang Shut-hing. The rear hall of the Study Hall was demolished in 1977. It is located in Tong Fong Tsuen. It is a Grade I historic building.

4. Kun Ting Study Hall
 was built by the Tang's for students preparing for the imperial civil service examination. It is a Grade I historic building.

5. Ching Shu Hin
 is an L-shaped two-storey building, adjoining Kun Ting Study Hall. It was constructed shortly after the completion of the Study Hall in 1870, and was used as a guest house. It is a Grade I historic building.

6. Tang Ancestral Hall
The  is one of the largest ancestral halls in the territory. It is located between Hang Mei Tsuen and Hang Tau Tsuen.

It was constructed by Tang Fung-shun, the fifth generation ancestor of Tang Clan about 700 years ago. It is the main ancestral hall of the Tang clan of Ping Shan. It is a three-hall structure with two internal courtyards. The wooden brackets and beams of the three halls are carved with auspicious Chinese motifs. Shiwan dragon-fish and pottery unicorns decorate the main ridges and roofs. There are ancestral tablets at the altar at the rear hall.

This ancestral hall is still used regularly for worship and celebrations of traditional festivals and ceremonies, as well as a meeting place for the Tang clan of Ping Shan.

7. Yu Kiu Ancestral Hall
 is situated adjacent to Tang Ancestral Hall, both declared monuments on December 14, 2001. There are three halls and two internal courtyards in the compound. The layout and design of Yu Kiu Ancestral Hall is the same as Tang Ancestral Hall.

It was built in the early sixteenth century by two eleventh generation brothers of the Tang clan of Ping Shan: Tang Sai-yin (alias Yu-sing) and Tang Sai-chiu (alias Kiu-lum). Apart from serving as an ancestral hall, the building was also used as a teaching hall for youngsters of Ping Shan. It was occupied by a primary school from 1931 to 1961. During the Guangxu reign (1875–1908) of the Qing dynasty, The last major renovation of the building probably took place; it was indicated by the engraved characters on the stone tablet above the main entrance.

8. Yan Tun Kong Study Hall
 is located in Hang Tau Tsuen. It is a declared monument.

9. Yeung Hau Temple
, located in Hang Tau Tsuen, is one of the six temples in Yuen Long dedicated to Hau Wong. It is a Grade III historic building.

10. Old well
On the trail between Yeung Hau Temple and Sheung Cheung Wai lies an old well that, according to the Tang villagers, was built by the residents of Hang Tau Tsuen more than 200 years ago and before the establishment of Sheung Cheung Wai, although the exact date of its construction cannot be traced. The well was once the main source of drinking water for both villages.

11. Sheung Cheung Wai
Sheung Cheung Wai is a walled village. It is one of the "Three Wais" (walled villages) of this part of Ping Shan. The other two are Fui Sha Wai and Kiu Tau Wai. Built about 200 years ago by a line of the Tang Clan that branched out from nearby Hang Tau Tsuen, it is the only walled village along the Ping Shan Heritage Trail. The moat that once surrounded the village has been filled. Three of the original watchtowers have collapsed and only the lower storey of the southwest one remains, which has been converted for residential use.

12. Shrine of the Earth God
Not far away to the west of Sheung Cheung Wai lies  dedicated to the Earth God who is known to the villagers as "She Kung". "She Kung" altars are commonly found in traditional Chinese villages as "She Kung" is believed to be the protector of villagers. "She Kung" is also known as "Pak Kung", "To Tei Kung" and "Fuk Tak Kung". The shrines for "She Kung" are usually simple brick structures on which pieces of stone are placed to symbolize the presence of the Deity.

13. Tsui Sing Lau Pagoda
Tsui Sing Lau Pagoda is Hong Kong's only ancient pagoda.
The name in Chinese means "Pagoda of Gathering Stars". It became a declared monument on 14 December 2001.

The Pagoda was built by Tang Yin-tung, the seventh generation ancestor, more than 600 years ago according to the genealogy of the Tang clan of Ping Shan. Oral history indicates the pagoda was originally a seven-storey hexagonal-shaped green-brick structure, but was damaged due to strong weather. At present it is a three-storey structure and it is about thirteen metres high. On the top floor, a statue of Fui Shing (Champion Star) is worshipped.

The pagoda was built to improve the feng shui of the locality so that flooding disasters were prevented to the village. It was also believed that its auspicious location, which is in alignment with Castle Peak, would ensure success for clan members in the Imperial Civil Service Examination. In fact, the Tang clan of Ping Shan has produced numerous scholars and officials.

14. Tat Tak Communal Hall
 is located north-west of Sheung Cheung Wai. It is a Declared monument.

Other sights
Several other historic buildings located in the area covered by the trail are not officially part of the trail. They include:

Fui Sha Wai
Fui Sha Wai is a walled village. It is one of the "Three Wais" of this part of Ping Shan.

Kiu Tau Wai
Kiu Tau Wai is a walled village. It is one of the "Three Wais" of this part of Ping Shan.

Ng Kwai Tong
 is a sub-family ancestral Hall in Hang Tau Tsuen. It was probably built in 1822.

Sau Choi Mansion
, located at No. 64 Hang Mei Tsuen, is a 160-year-old mansion, handed down through six generations. As its former residents, Tang Shut-hing and Tang Tai-shing obtained the official posts through imperial civil service examination, the house is now called Sau Choi Mansion. The house was refurnished and now houses relics and information Tang clan.
Tours can be arranged on Saturdays, Sundays and Public Holidays.

Sing Hin Kung Study Hall
 is located in Hang Mei Tsuen. It is a Grade II historic building. Not open to the public.

Yeuk Hui Study Hall
, located in Hang Mei Tsuen, is listed as a Grade III historic building.

See also
 Heritage trails in Hong Kong
 Lung Yeuk Tau Heritage Trail, in Fanling

References

Further reading

External links

 Ping Shan Heritage Trail on Antiquities and Monuments Office website
 Ping Shan Heritage Trail on Education and Manpower Bureau website
 Ping Shan Heritage Trail photos and info - covers a walk along the trail, with photos en route.

Ping Shan
Heritage conservation in Hong Kong
Museums in Hong Kong
Classical Lingnan-style buildings
Heritage trails